Riverside Plantation may refer to:

Riverside Plantation (Enterprise, Mississippi), listed on the NRHP in Mississippi
Riverside Plantation Tabby Ruins, Frogmore, South Carolina, listed on the NRHP in South Carolina